Nathalie Tauziat was the defending champion, but lost to Anna Kournikova in the semifinals.

Martina Hingis won the title, defeating Kournikova in the final 6–3, 6–1.

Seeds
The top four seeds received a bye to the second round.

  Martina Hingis (champion)
  Nathalie Tauziat (semifinals)
  Arantxa Sánchez Vicario (second round)
  Anna Kournikova (final)
  Amélie Mauresmo (semifinals)
  Julie Halard-Decugis (first round)
  Elena Dementieva (quarterfinals)
  Barbara Schett (quarterfinals)

Draw

Finals

Top half

Bottom half

Qualifying

Qualifying seeds

Qualifiers

Qualifying draw

First qualifier

Second qualifier

Third qualifier

Fourth qualifier

References

External links
 Official results archive (ITF)
 Official results archive (WTA)

Kremlin Cup
Kremlin Cup